Georgetown is an unincorporated community in Madison County, Arkansas, United States.

References

Unincorporated communities in Madison County, Arkansas
Unincorporated communities in Arkansas